Chusmiza complex (also known as Cerros de Sotoca) is a Miocene volcano in Chile. It is constructed from andesite. Potassium-argon dating has established an age of 11.3±0.3 mya.

References 

Stratovolcanoes of Chile
Miocene stratovolcanoes